Clwyd North West was a parliamentary constituency in Clwyd, North Wales. It returned one Member of Parliament (MP) to the House of Commons of the Parliament of the United Kingdom by the first past the post system.

History
The constituency was created for the 1983 general election, and abolished for the 1997 general election.

From 1983 to 1992, it was represented by Conservative MP Anthony Meyer, who unsuccessfully tried to challenge the leadership of prime minister Margaret Thatcher in late 1989. As a result, he was de-selected by fellow Conservative MP's as the party's candidate for the next general election, which was ultimately held on 9 April 1992 and saw the Tories hold the seat with new MP Rod Richards.

Boundaries 
The constituency covered a section of the North Wales coast that stretched between the resort towns of Colwyn Bay and Rhyl.

Members of Parliament

Elections

Elections in the 1980s

Elections in the 1990s

See also
List of parliamentary constituencies in Clwyd

Notes and references 

Clwyd
Historic parliamentary constituencies in North Wales
Constituencies of the Parliament of the United Kingdom established in 1983
Constituencies of the Parliament of the United Kingdom disestablished in 1997